The Mundaú River is a river in northeastern Brazil. The Mundaú originates in the Borborema Plateau of Pernambuco state, and flows southeast through Pernambuco and Alagoas states to empty into the Mundaú Lagoon at Maceió, Alagoas' capital. Mundaú Lagoon is an estuary, connected to the Atlantic Ocean and Manguaba Lagoon to the south by a network of channels.

References

Rivers of Alagoas
Rivers of Pernambuco